The European Regional Development Fund (ERDF) is one of the European Structural and Investment Funds allocated by the European Union. Its purpose is to transfer money from richer regions (not countries), and invest it in the infrastructure and services of underdeveloped regions. This will allow those regions to start attracting private sector investments, and create jobs on their own.

History
During the 1960s, the European Commission occasionally tried to establish a regional fund, but only Italy ever supported it. Britain made it an issue for its accession in 1973, and pushed for its creation at the 1972 summit in Paris. Britain was going to be a large contributor to the CAP and the EEC budget, and sought to offset this deficit by having the ERDF established. They would then be able to show their public some tangible benefits of EEC membership. The ERDF was set to be running by 1973, but the 1973 oil crisis delayed it, and it was only established in 1975 under considerable British and Italian pressure.

It started with a budget of 1.4 billion units of account, much less than the original British proposal of 2.4 billion units of account, but has increased rapidly both proportionally and absolutely in the course of time. Since its creation, it has operated under changing set of rules that were standardised with Single European Act and is now in its 2014–2020 period.

Scope (2014–2020)
As part of its task to promote regional development, the ERDF contributes towards financing the following measures:

Objective convergence
 Modernising and diversifying economic structures
 Creating sustainable jobs
 Stimulating economic growth
 Attention to urban, remote, mountainous, sparsely populated, and the outermost regions

Regional competitiveness and employment
 Innovation and knowledge economy (e.g., research and technological development, innovation and entrepreneurship, financial engineering)
 Environment and risk prevention (e.g., cleaning up polluted areas, energy efficiency, clean urban public transport, risk prevention plans)
 Access to transport and telecommunications

Territorial cooperation
 Cross-border economic, social, and environmental activities
 Transnational cooperation, including bilateral cooperation between maritime regions
 Inter-regional cooperation, including networking and exchange of experiences between regional and local authorities

ERDF compliance

All awards of ERDF must comply with European Union competition law (including State Aid Law and Government procurement in the European Union). Failure to comply with these legal requirements may result in irregularity rulings which carry financial implications.

Criticism
One project supported by the Fund is the  Golf Club Campo de Golf in the African Spanish exclave Melilla, located right next to the border with Morocco where African migrants regularly attempt to enter the territory of the EU by climbing a triple fence with razor wire. In 2009, Ecologists in Action called the location insulting and asked the EU to investigate why more than €1.1m was given to the project by the ERDF. The petition was dismissed, because the objectives of the golf course to “increase tourism, create jobs and promote sport and sporting values” was compatible with the goals of the ERDF.

See also 
European Structural and Investment Funds
European Grouping for Territorial Cooperation
Grande Région
ENPI Italy–Tunisia CBC Programme
Greece–Bulgaria European Territorial Cooperation Programme
Venture capital in Poland

References

External links
 Open Data Portal for the European Structural Investment Funds
 Summary of ERDF legislation
 North Sea Region Programme Transnational Cooperation Programme under the ERDF
 Baltic Sea Region Programme Transnational Cooperation Programme under the ERDF
 Alpine Space Programme Transnational Cooperation Programme under the ERDF
 Atlantic Area Operational Programme Transnational Cooperation Programme under the ERDF
 INTERREG North-West Europe Programme Transnational Cooperation Programme under the ERDF

Economy of the European Union
Regional policies of the European Union

eo:Eŭropaj Strukturaj Fondusoj